

Stun’Sail Boom is a locality in the Australian state of South Australia located on the south coast of Kangaroo Island overlooking the body of water known in Australia as the Southern Ocean and by international authorities as the Great Australian Bight.

Its boundaries were created in May 2002 for the “long established name” which is derived from the river located within its boundaries.

The land use within the locality consists of agriculture and conservation.

The locality includes the Tilka Huts, Shed and Graves Site which is listed on the South Australian Heritage Register

Stun’Sail Boom is located within the federal division of Mayo, the state electoral district of Mawson and the local government area of the Kangaroo Island Council.

References
Notes

Citations

Towns on Kangaroo Island